Franmil Federico Reyes (born July 7, 1995) is a Dominican professional baseball outfielder and designated hitter in the Kansas City Royals organization. He previously played in Major League Baseball (MLB) for the San Diego Padres, Cleveland Indians / Guardians and Chicago Cubs.

Professional career

San Diego Padres (2011–2019)

Minor leagues (2011–2018)
Reyes signed with the San Diego Padres as an international free agent in 2011. He made his professional debut in 2012 with the Dominican Summer League Padres and spent the whole season there, batting .267/.360/.416 with four home runs and 37 RBIs in 67 games. He played 2013 with the Arizona League Padres and Eugene Emeralds where he compiled a .292 batting average with four home runs and 34 RBIs in 57 games, 2014 with the Fort Wayne TinCaps where he posted a .248 batting average with 11 home runs and 59 RBIs in 128 games, and 2015 back with Fort Wayne where he slashed .255/.320/.393 with eight home runs and 62 RBIs in 123 games.

Reyes played 2016 with the Lake Elsinore Storm where he batted .278 with 16 home runs and 83 RBIs in 130 games, and 2017 with the San Antonio Missions where he compiled a .258 batting average with 25 home runs, 102 RBIs, and a .785 on-base plus slugging (OPS) in 135 games. He started 2018 with the El Paso Chihuahuas. After batting .346/.442/.738 with 14 home runs and 38 RBIs in 36 games for El Paso, he was promoted to the San Diego Padres on May 14.

Major leagues (2018–2019)
Reyes made his Major League debut on May 14, 2018, against the Colorado Rockies, getting the start in right field after outfielders Wil Myers and Hunter Renfroe had both been placed on the injured list.  Reyes hit his first MLB home run on May 21 at Nationals Park  Reyes was optioned back to Triple-A El Paso on May 31 when Myers returned to the Padres.  He returned to the team on July 10 and made regular starts in right field until he was optioned again on July 21 when Myers returned from a different injury. Reyes was recalled for a span of 10 games in July, but only saw 12 at-bats, serving mostly as a pinch hitter. He returned to the team in early August when Myers again went to the disabled list.  After this fourth promotion, Reyes improved his approach at the plate and raised his average from .221 to .280 through the end of the season while making regular starts in right field. On August 30, he hit a walk-off home run in the 13th inning against Colorado. Reyes finished the season with an .838 OPS and 16 home runs in 261 at-bats and 71 starts in right field.

Reyes had surgery in the off-season to repair a torn right knee meniscus.

Cleveland Indians / Guardians (2019–2022)
On July 31, 2019, the Padres traded Reyes to the Cleveland Indians in a three-team trade that also included the Cincinnati Reds. The Indians also acquired Logan Allen and minor leaguer Victor Nova from the Padres and Yasiel Puig and minor league pitcher Scott Moss from the Reds, while the Reds acquired Trevor Bauer from the Indians and the Padres acquired minor leaguer Taylor Trammell from the Reds.

In 2019 in aggregate Reyes batted .249/.310/.512. He made contact with the lowest percentage of pitches he swung at (65.4%) of all major league batters. Overall with the 2020 Cleveland Indians, Reyes batted .275 with nine home runs and 34 RBIs in 59 games.

In 2021, Reyes batted .254 with 30 home runs, and 85 RBIs across 115 games. Reyes missed late May, and the entire month of June, due to an oblique strain.

The Guardians designated Reyes for assignment on August 6, 2022.

Chicago Cubs (2022)
On August 8, 2022, Reyes was claimed off waivers by the Chicago Cubs. Reyes appeared in 48 games for the Cubs down the stretch, slashing .234/.301/.389 with 5 home runs and 19 RBI. He elected free agency on November 10, 2022.

Kansas City Royals (2023–present)
On February 15, 2023, Reyes signed a minor league contract with the Kansas City Royals organization.

References

External links

1995 births
Arizona League Padres players
Chicago Cubs players
Cleveland Guardians players
Cleveland Indians players
Dominican Republic expatriate baseball players in the United States
Dominican Summer League Padres players
El Paso Chihuahuas players
Eugene Emeralds players
Fort Wayne TinCaps players
Lake Elsinore Storm players
Leones del Escogido players
Living people
Major League Baseball players from the Dominican Republic
Major League Baseball right fielders
People from San Cristóbal Province
Peoria Javelinas players
San Antonio Missions players
San Diego Padres players